"National Working Woman's Holiday" is a song written by Roger Murrah, Pat Terry and James Dean Hicks, and recorded by American country music artist Sammy Kershaw.  It was released in June 1994 as the lead-off single from his album Feelin' Good Train.  It peaked at number 2 in the United States, and number 3 in Canada.

Content
The song's narrator thinks that his wife is working too hard, and so he says that she should take the day off for the "national working woman's holiday".

Music video
The music video was directed by Michael Merriman. It has been seen on CMT, The Nashville Network, and CMT Pure Country.

Chart positions

Year-end charts

References

Sammy Kershaw songs
1994 singles
Songs written by Roger Murrah
Song recordings produced by Buddy Cannon
Song recordings produced by Norro Wilson
Mercury Records singles
1994 songs
Songs written by James Dean Hicks